122 may refer to:
122 (number), a natural number
AD 122, a year in the 2nd century AD
122 BC, a year in the 2nd century BC
122 (film), a 2019 Egyptian psychological horror film
"One Twenty Two", a 2022 single by the American rock band Botch

12/2 may refer to:
December 2 (month-day date notation)
February 12 (day-month date notation)
12 shillings and 2 pence in UK predecimal currency

See also
 2/12 (disambiguation)
 Unbibium, a hypothetical chemical element with atomic number 122